Mount Misery is a 284-foot hill and public conservation land in Lincoln, Massachusetts on Route 117 (Great Road)  and on the Bay Circuit Trail near the Sudbury River. Containing 227 acres Mount Misery is the largest piece of conservation land in the town and contains seven miles of public hiking trails through hills, wetlands and agricultural fields.

History
Although it is unknown for certain, Mount Misery may take its name from the death of a pair of oxen or a sheep on the hill in colonial times. By 1667 the Billings family owned land around the brook and eventually operated a saw mill on the Beaver Dam Brook just below what is now the upper pond at the base of Mount Misery. Evidence of this mill remains today near the brook. Concord writer Henry David Thoreau often hiked and recorded his experiences on the hill in his journal in the 1850s. In the 1940s James DeNormandie acquired much of the land around Mount Misery to prevent it from being developed and for his own agriculture uses. He dammed the brook and excavated soil to form the lower pond, as well as re-damming the original upper mill pond, and he built a cabin on the top of Mount Misery which later burned. DeNormandie sold Mount Misery to the town as public conservation land in 1969. The land contains Beaver Dam Brook which is still home to several beavers and Terrapin Lake, a kettle hole, where cranberries were grown until the 1990s.

References

External links
Official website

Lincoln, Massachusetts
Hills of Massachusetts
Landforms of Middlesex County, Massachusetts
Protected areas of Middlesex County, Massachusetts